Child Maltreatment is a peer-reviewed academic journal that publishes papers in the field of psychology, family studies and social work. It has been in publication since 1996 and is currently published by SAGE Publications in association with American Professional Society on the Abuse of Children. Vincent J. Palusci, MD, MS (New York University Grossman School of Medicine) became editor in chief in 2021.

Scope 
Child Maltreatment aims to report current and at-issue scientific information and technical innovations in a form immediately useful to practitioners and researchers from fields such as mental health, child protection, medicine and law. The multidisciplinary journal provides a forum for the discussion on dissemination of research and findings.

Abstracting and indexing 
Child Maltreatment is abstracted and indexed in, among other databases:  SCOPUS, and the Social Sciences Citation Index. According to the Journal Citation Reports, its 2017 impact factor is 4.047, ranking it 2 out of 42 journals in the category "Social Work," and 3 out of 48 journals in the category "Family Studies."

References

External links 
 
 

SAGE Publishing academic journals
English-language journals